Airi Pirjo Maritta Wilmi-Rokkanen (née Wilmi, formerly Häggman; born 8 June 1951) is a retired Finnish sprinter who specialized in the 400 metres.

Häggman was a member of the Finnish silver medal 4 × 400 m relay team at the 1974 European Athletics Championships in Rome. She competed at the 1972, 1976 and 1980 Summer Olympics. 1976 Häggman finished fourth, missing the bronze medal by 0.01 seconds.

In 1981 Häggman and Venezuelan Flor Isava-Fonseca were the first women to be elected as International Olympic Committee members. She resigned in January 1999 due to the 2002 Winter Olympic bid scandal. Häggman's ex-husband had been working as a paid consultant for the Salt Lake Organizing Committee during the bidding process.

References 

1951 births
People from Sotkamo
Finnish female sprinters
Olympic athletes of Finland
European Athletics Championships medalists
Athletes (track and field) at the 1972 Summer Olympics
Athletes (track and field) at the 1976 Summer Olympics
Athletes (track and field) at the 1980 Summer Olympics
International Olympic Committee members
Universiade medalists in athletics (track and field)
Living people
Universiade gold medalists for Finland
Medalists at the 1975 Summer Universiade
Olympic female sprinters
Sportspeople from Kainuu